Luise Fong (born 1964) is a Malaysian-born New Zealand artist. Her work is in the permanent collection of Auckland Art Gallery Toi o Tāmaki.

Fong was born in Sandakan, Malaysia in 1964 and moved to New Zealand as a child. In 1983 she began studying textile design at Wellington Polytechnic. In 1986 she was accepted into Elam School of Fine Arts at the University of Auckland, graduating with a Bachelor of Fine Arts degree in print-making in 1989.

Between 1993 and 1994 Fong worked as a junior lecturer at Elam School of Fine Arts. In 1994 she was the artist-in-residence at the Victorian College of the Arts at the University of Melbourne and in the same year was the joint winner (with Bill Hammond) of the Visa Gold Art Award. In 1995 Fong moved to Melbourne and lived and worked there until 2001, when she was appointed lecturer in painting at Elam School of Fine Arts. She remained there until 2005.

Fong's work has been included in several important international exhibitions, including Cultural Safety: Contemporary Art from New Zealand, Frankfurter Kunstverein, 1995 and Trans/fusion: Hong Kong artists' exchange, Hong Kong Arts Centre and Auckland Art Gallery, 1996.

Fong has held a number of residency positions; in 1995 she was an artist-in-residence at the Govett-Brewster Art Gallery, and in 1999 she was the Visiting Artist at the University of Canterbury. In 2008 she was resident artist at the Colin McCahon House in Auckland.

References

1964 births
Living people
Malaysian emigrants to New Zealand
New Zealand people of Malaysian descent
New Zealand artists
Elam Art School alumni